Zeeshan (Zişan) or Zeshan (Zeşan) is a Turkish given name, derived from words "Zee"  (possessor of, from Arabic  ذو) and "Shan" (high status or splendor, from Arabic شأن), sometimes simply translated as "princely" or "Moon". This word is also used in Persian, Urdu and sometimes in Turkish poetry as an adjective.

In South Asia, this name is mostly used for males; however, the name is neutral in gender and can also be used for females (mostly in Turkey) with meanings "Moon", "magnificent" and "brilliant".

Variant forms and similar names 
The diminutive or nickname for Zeeshan is Shaan or "Shani".

Jishan is a Bihari and Indian cognate for the same word, so written due to the lack of a native 'Z' sound in Sanskrit-derived languages.

Notable people with this name 
Mohammad Zeeshan (born 2006), Pakistani cricketer
Mohammed Zeeshan Ayyub (actor, born 1983), Indian actor
Zeshan Zaffar (born 1990), Pakistani Lecturer of International Relations 
Zeeshan Abbasi (born 1982), Pakistani blind cricketer
Zeeshan Ali (born 1970), Indian tennis player
Zeeshan Ashraf (born 1977), Pakistani hockey player
Zeeshan Khan (cricketer, born 1976), Pakistani cricketer
Zeeshan Khan (cricketer, born 1992), Pakistani cricketer
Zeeshan Maqsood (born 1987), Omani cricketer
Zeeshan Parwez, Pakistani musician in Sajid & Zeeshan, electronic music duo from Peshawar
Zeshan "Zesh" Rehman (born 1983), British Pakistani footballer
Zeeshan Anis Siddiqui, UK citizen apprehended in Pakistan
Zeeshan Zameer (born 2002), Pakistani cricketer

References

Turkish masculine given names
Turkish feminine given names
Arabic masculine given names
Iranian masculine given names
Pakistani masculine given names